Ernst-Robert Grawitz (8 June 1899 – 24 April 1945) was a German physician and an SS functionary (Reichsarzt, "arzt" meaning "physician") during the Nazi era.

Biography 
Grawitz was born in Charlottenburg, in the western part of Berlin, Germany. As Reichsarzt SS und Polizei (Reich Physician SS and Police), Grawitz was also head of the German Red Cross.

Grawitz funded Nazi programs to "eradicate the perverted world of the homosexual" and research into a so-called "cure" for homosexuality. This involved experimentation on inmates in Nazi concentration camps. He was in charge of "enthusiastic" experiments on concentration camp inmates.

Grawitz was also a part of the group in charge of the murder of mentally ill and physically handicapped people in the Action T4 "euthanasia" programme, including children from 1939. The officials selected the doctors who were to carry out the operational part of the killing programme. In addition, researchers both in and outside the SS wanted to exploit the supply of inmates held in the SS camps and use them for experiments. In order to do so, the interested parties had to apply to Grawitz, who forwarded requests to Reichsführer-SS Heinrich Himmler who then gave final approval.

Towards the end of World War II in Europe, Grawitz was a physician in Adolf Hitler's Führerbunker. When he heard that other officials were leaving Berlin in order to escape the advancing Soviet Red Army, Grawitz petitioned Hitler to allow him to leave Berlin; his request was denied. As the Soviet Army advanced on Berlin, Grawitz killed himself and his family with grenades at their house in Babelsberg.

References 

1899 births
1945 deaths
1945 suicides
20th-century Freikorps personnel
Aktion T4 personnel
Deaths by hand grenade
Familicides
German Red Cross personnel
Joint suicides by Nazis
Kapp Putsch participants
Nazi concentration camp personnel
Nazis who committed suicide in Germany
People from Charlottenburg
Physicians from Berlin
Physicians in the Nazi Party
SS-Obergruppenführer
Suicides by explosive device
Waffen-SS personnel